Abortion in Japan is allowed under a term limit of 22 weeks for endangerment to the health of the pregnant woman, economic hardship, or rape. Chapter XXIX of the Penal Code of Japan makes abortion de jure illegal in the country, but exceptions to the law are broad enough that it is widely accepted and practiced. Exceptions to the prohibition of abortion are regulated by the Maternal Health Protection Law that allows approved doctors to practice abortion on a woman if  the pregnancy was the result of rape or if the continuation of the pregnancy endangers the maternal health because of physical or economic reasons. Anyone trying to practice abortion without the consent of the woman will be prosecuted, including the doctors. If a woman is married, consent from her spouse is also needed  to approve abortions for socioeconomic reasons, although the rule doesn't apply if she is in a broken marriage, suffering abuse or other domestic issues. Despite the partner’s consent not being necessary for unmarried women and women who were impregnated by abusive partners or through rape, many doctors and medical institutions seek a signature from the man believed to have made the woman pregnant for fear of getting into legal trouble, rights advocates say.

No abortifacient has been approved in Japan. Approved doctors, however, can choose to use imported abortifacient under the same Maternal Health Protection Law. Any other person who aborts a fetus using abortifacients will be punished.

History 
In 1842, the Shogunate in Japan banned induced abortion in Edo, but the law did not affect the rest of the country until 1869, when abortion was banned nationwide. However, the crime was rarely punished unless the conception was a result of adultery or the woman died as a result of the abortion procedure.

According to the scholar Tiana Norgern, the abortion policy under the Meiji government was similar to that of the Edo period, and was fueled by the belief that a large population would yield more military and political influence on the international stage. In 1868, the emperor banned midwives from performing abortions, and in 1880, Japan's first penal code declared abortion a crime. The punishments for abortion grew more severe in 1907 when the penal code revised: women could be incarcerated for up to a year for having an abortion; practitioners could be jailed for up to seven. The Criminal Abortion Law of 1907 is still technically in effect today, but other legislation has overridden its effects.

In 1923, doctors were granted legal permission to perform emergency abortions to save the mother's life; abortions performed under different, less life-threatening circumstances were still prosecuted. In 1931, the Alliance for Reform of the Anti-Abortion Law (Datai Hō Kaisei Kiseikai) was formed by Abe Isoo and argued that "it is a woman's right not to bear a child she does not want, and abortion is an exercise of this right". This organization believed that abortion should be made legal in circumstances in which there was a high chance of genetic disorder; in which a woman was poor, on public assistance, or divorced; in which it endangered the woman's health; and in which the pregnancy was a result of rape. In 1934, the Fifth All-Japan Women's Suffrage Congress wrote up resolutions calling for the legalization of abortion as well as contraception. This did not result in any immediate reaction from the government at the time, but after the war, these resolutions were consulted when drafting legislation legalizing abortion.

In 1940, the National Eugenic Law stopped short of explicitly calling abortion legal by outlining a set of procedures a doctor had to follow in order to perform an abortion; these procedures included getting second opinions and submitting reports, though these could be ignored when it was an emergency. This was a daunting and complicated process that many physicians did not want to deal with, and some sources attribute the fall in abortion rate between 1941 and 1944 from 18,000 to 1,800 to this legislation.

After World War II, Japan found itself in a population crisis. In 1946, 10 million people were declared at risk of starvation, and between the years 1945 and 1950, the population increased by 11 million. In 1948, in the wake of the Miyuki Ishikawa case, Japan legalized abortion under special circumstances. The Eugenic Protection Law of 1948 made Japan one of the first countries to legalize induced abortion. In 1949, a revision passed which provided abortion in the case of extreme physical or economic distress to the mother. A further stipulation was added in 1952 requiring that the mother meet an economic threshold of poor living conditions to obtain an abortion. The whole law was revised as the Maternal Health Protection Law in 1996.

Statistics 
Overall, in 2019, the total number of abortions officially reported was 156,430, representing a 56 percent decrease from the number reported for 2000.  The overall abortion rate changed from 22.3 to 15.3 abortions per 1,000 women aged 15-39 years. Going further back, there were 598,084 abortions in 1980 and 1,063,256 in 1960. In 2019, 49 abortions were reported for women aged 13 and under, and a further 3,904 for women aged 14–17. Some 39,805 abortions were performed on women aged 20-24.

In 2020, according to the health ministry, there were 145,340 abortions, down 7.3% from the previous year.

According to researchers, in more than 99 percent of cases, the reason reported for performing an abortion was to protect the woman's health; this percentage remained constant during 1975–1995. The same researchers also suggest that while official figures may be lower than the true rate of abortion due to under-reporting by doctors in order to lower tax bills and protect patient identities, trends may be "reasonably accurate".

Contraceptive use 
A scenario study was conducted to assess the extent to which the unintended pregnancy rate in Japan, for the period when oral contraceptives (OC) had not yet been legalized for family planning purposes and couples relied mainly on condoms, might change if more women were to use OC. Data provided by the 1994 Japanese National Survey on Family Planning were used to construct scenarios for national contraceptive use. Annual failure rates of contraceptive methods and nonuse were applied to the contraceptive use scenarios, to obtain estimates of the annual number of contraceptive failure-related pregnancies. Subsequently, contraceptive practice situations assuming higher OC use rates were defined, and the associated change in the number of contraceptive failure-related pregnancies was estimated for each situation. It emerged that OC use rates of 15% decreased the expected number of unintended pregnancies by 13–17%, whereas use rates of 25% resulted in decreases of 22–29% and use rates of 50% in decreases of 45–58%. The findings were reasonably robust to variation in the assumptions that were made. In conclusion, each theoretical percentage increase in the OC use rate in Japan was found to lead to a roughly equivalent percentage decrease in the number of unintended pregnancies.

Oral contraceptives were legalized in 1999. Emergency contraceptive pills were approved by the Ministry of Health, Labour and Welfare of Japan in 2011.

See also
Abortion law
Mizuko kuyo
Birth control in Japan

References

Health law in Japan
Japan
Japan
Women's rights in Japan
Birth control in Japan
Healthcare in Japan